Mi Fu (also given as Mi Fei, 1051–1107 CE) was a Chinese painter, poet and calligrapher who was born in Taiyuan during the Song dynasty. He became known for his style of painting misty landscapes. This style would be deemed the "Mi Fu" style and involved the use of large wet dots of ink applied with a flat brush. His poetry was influenced by Li Bai and his calligraphy by Wang Xizhi.

Mi Fu is regarded as one of the four greatest calligraphers of the Song dynasty, alongside Su Shi, Hung Tingjian and Cai Xian. His style is derived from calligraphers in earlier dynasties, although he developed unique traits of his own.

As a personality, Mi Fu was noted as an eccentric; including a mania of cleanliness. At times, he was deemed "Madman Mi" due to his obsession with collecting stones. He was also known to be a heavy drinker. His son, Mi Youren, also became a well known painter following in his father's artistic style.

Biography

According to Yao Weiyuan, Mi Fu was a fifth-generation descendant of Mi Xin, a Later Zhou and early Song dynasty general from the Kumo Xi tribe that descended from the Xianbei. However, according to other scholars, his family probably was of distant Sogdian heritage. His surname "Mi" is of Sogdian origin, and he was born after a long period in which the Sogdians intensively migrated deep into China and established flourishing communities there, and he referred to himself as "descendant of huozheng," "fire priest" (according to Jiang Boqin), having a seal with this inscribed on it. However, other Chinese scholars reject Jiang's interpretation, saying that huozheng referred to "Fire virtue" and was related to the Zhao family, and that he had other seals claiming different things.

He showed early signs of interest in arts and letters, as well as unusual memory skills. His mother worked as a midwife and later as a wet-nurse, looking after the Emperor Shenzong.

Mi Fu knew the imperial family and he lived in the privileged location of the royal palaces, where he also started his career as Reviser of Books, Professor of Painting and Calligraphy in the capital, Secretary to the Board of Rites, and Military Governor of Huaiyang. Mi Fu openly criticized conventional regulations of the time, causing him to move between jobs frequently.

Mi Fu collected old writings and paintings as his family wealth gradually diminished. Gradually his collection's value grew. He also inherited some of the calligraphies in his collection. He wrote:

When a man of today obtains such an old sample it seems to him as important as his life, which is ridiculous. It is in accordance with human nature, that things which satisfy the eye, when seen for a long time become boring; therefore, they should be exchanged for fresh examples, which then appear double satisfying. That is the intelligent way of using pictures.

He arranged his collection in two parts, one of which was kept secret (or shown only to a few selected friends) and another which could be shown to visitors.

In his later years, Mi Fu became very fond of Holin Temple (located on Yellow Crane Mountain (黃鶴樓)). He later asked to be buried at its gate. Today the temple is gone, but his grave remains.

Historical background

After the rise of landscape painting, creative activities followed which were of a more general kind and included profane, religious figure, bird, flower and bamboo paintings besides landscapes. It was all carried out by men of high intellectual standards. To most of these men, painting was not a professional occupation but only one of the means by which they expressed their intellectual reactions to life and nature in visible symbols. Poetry and illustrative writing were in a sense even more important to them than painting and they made their living as more or less prominent government officials if they did not depend on family wealth. Even if some of them were skilled at ink painting and calligraphy, they avoided the fame and position of professional artists and became known as "gentleman-painters." Artistic occupations such as calligraphy and painting were seen as leisure activities from official duties or practical occupations. Nevertheless, the foundation of their technical mastery was in writing and calligraphy, which allowed them to transmit their thoughts with the same easiness in symbols of nature as in conventional characters. Their art became therefore a very intimate kind of expression, or idea-writing as it was called in later times. The beauty of this art was indeed closely connected to the visible ease with which it was produced, but which after all could not be achieved without intense training and deep thought.

Mi Fu was one of the highly gifted gentleman-painters. With his very keen talent of artistic observation together with sense of humor and literary ability, he established for himself a prominent place among Chinese art historians; his contributions in this field are still highly valued because they are based on what he had seen with his own eyes and not simply on what he had heard or learned from his forerunners. Mi Fu had the courage to express his own views, even when these were different from the prevailing ones or official opinions. His notes about painting and calligraphy are of great interest to art historians because they are spontaneous expressions of his own observations and independent ideas that help to characterize himself as well as the artists whose works he discusses.

Art

He is considered one of the most important representatives of the Southern School (南宗畫) of landscape painting. However, it is no longer possible clearly to say this from the pictures which passed under his name – many works are attributed to him, and most of them represent a rather definite type or pictorial style which existed also in later centuries, but to what extent they can be considered as Mi Fu's own creations is still a question. Therefore, he is more remembered as a skilled calligrapher and for his influence as a critic and writer on art rather than a skilled landscape painter.

Mi Fu was among those for whom writing or calligraphy was intimately connected with the composing of poetry or sketching. It required an alertness of mind and spirit, which he thought was best achieved through the enjoyment of wine. Through this he reached a state of excitement rather than drunkenness. A friend of Mi Fu, Su Shih (蘇軾) admired him and wrote that his brush was like a sharp sword handled skillfully in fight or a bow which could shoot the arrow a thousand li, piercing anything that might be in its way. "It was the highest perfection of the art of calligraphy", he wrote.

Other critics claimed that only Mi Fu could imitate the style of the great calligraphers of the Six Dynasties. Mi Fu's son testified that his father always kept some calligraphic masterpiece of the Tang or the Qin period in his desk as a model. At night he would place it in a box at the side of his pillow.

According to some writings, Mi Fu did most of his paintings during the last seven years of his life, and he himself wrote that "he chose as his models the most ancient masters and painted guided by his own genius and not by any teacher and thus represented the loyal men of antiquity."

The pictures which still pass under Mi Fu's name represent ranges of wooded hills or cone-shaped mountain peaks rising out of layers of woolly mist. At their feet may be water and closer towards the foreground clusters of dark trees. One of the best known examples of this kind of Mi Fu style is the small picture in the Palace Museum known as Spring Mountains and Pine-Trees. It is in the size of a large album-leaf, but at the top of the picture is added a poem said to be by the emperor Emperor Gaozong of Song.

Among the pictures which are attributed to Mi Fu, there apparently are imitations, even if they are painted in a similar manner with a broad and soft brush. They may be from Southern Song period, or possibly from the Yuan period, when some of the leading painters freely utilized the manner of Mi Fu for expressing their own ideas. The majority are probably from the later part of Ming period, when a cult of Mi Fu followers that viewed him as the most important representative of the Southern School started. Mi Fu himself had seen many imitations, perhaps even of his own works and he saw how wealthy amateurs spent their money on great names rather than on original works of art. He wrote that they "place their pictures in brocade bags and provide them with jade rollers as if they were very wonderful treasures, but when they open them one cannot but break out into laughter."

Mi Fu's own manner of painting has been characterized by writers who knew it through their own observation or through hearsay. It is said that he always painted on paper which had not been prepared with gum or alum (alauns), never on silk or on the wall. In addition, he did not necessarily use the brush in painting with ink; sometimes he used paper sticks or sugar cane from which the juice had been extracted, or a calyx (kauss) of the lotus.

Even if Mi Fu was principally a landscape painter, he also did portraits and figure paintings of an old-fashioned type. Nevertheless, he must have spent more time studying samples of ancient calligraphy and painting than producing pictures of his own. His book, History of Painting, contains practical hints as to the proper way of collecting, preserving, cleaning and mounting pictures.

See also

 Chinese art
 Chinese painting
 Culture of the Song Dynasty
 History of Chinese art

Citations

General references 
 Barnhart, R. M. et al. (1997). Three Thousand years of Chinese Painting. New Haven, Conn.: Yale University Press. . p. 373.
 Rhonda and Jeffrey Cooper (1997). Masterpieces of Chinese Art. Todtri Productions. . p. 76.
 Xiao, Yanyi, "Mi Fu". Encyclopedia of China (Arts Edition), 1st ed.

External links

 Mi Fu and his Calligraphy Gallery at China Online Museum
 

1051 births
1107 deaths
11th-century Chinese calligraphers
11th-century Chinese painters
11th-century Chinese poets
12th-century Chinese calligraphers
12th-century Chinese painters
12th-century Chinese poets
Painters from Shanxi
People from Taiyuan
Poets from Shanxi
Song dynasty calligraphers
Song dynasty painters
Song dynasty poets